Umuekwule Afugiri is one of the eleven villages that make-up Afugiri in Ohuhu, Umuahia North LGA of Abia State, Nigeria, West Africa.

External links
Umuekwule.com

Populated places in Abia State